Charles Calvin "Cal" Clemens, Jr. (July 7, 1909 – October 21, 1965) was an American football blocking back for the Green Bay Packers of the National Football League (NFL) in 1936. He played college football at the University of Southern California. He was a member of the 1936 Packers NFL Championship team.

See also
List of Green Bay Packers players

References

1909 births
1965 deaths
Sportspeople from Oklahoma City
Players of American football from Oklahoma
Green Bay Packers players
University of Southern California alumni
USC Trojans football players
Place of death missing